The Shiva Stuti, is a famous stuti (poem) composed by Narayana Panditacharya in praise of the deity Shiva written in the Prithvi metre. Stuti means eulogy, singing praise, panegyric and to praise the virtues, deeds, and nature of God.

Description
The Shiva Stuti consists of 13 verses and is recited daily or on special festivals like Maha Shivaratri by Hindus. According to legend, Narayana Panditacharya is believed to have travelled to the Rameshwaram Temple, when the doors were closed. After chanting this hymn, the doors are believed to have opened of their own will, and the author is said to have received a darshana (auspicious vision) of Shiva.

The authorship of the Shiva Stuti is attributed to Narayana Panditacharya, a poet-saint who lived in the 14th century CE. He mentions his name in the last verse of the hymn. It is said in the 13th verse of the Shiva Stuti that whoever chants it with full devotion to Shiva would receive have the deity's grace. Among Hindus worldwide, it is a very popular belief that chanting the Shiva Stuti invokes Shiva's divine intervention in grave problems.

Author
Narayana Panditacharya (1290–1370) was a Hindu poet-saint, reformer and philosopher. A composer of several popular works, he is best known for being the author of the epic Sri Madhva Vijaya, a biographical work of the great Dvaita philosopher Madhvacharya in the Sanskrit language.

Commentaries
Chalari Narasimhacharya wrote a commentary on Shiva Stuti.

See also 
 Hinduism
 Shiva
 Dvaita literature
 List of suktas and stutis

References

Bibliography
 

Dvaita Vedanta
Shaiva texts
Hindu devotional texts
Hindu texts
Sanskrit texts
Hymns